Tom Rack is a Canadian actor and writer best known for his portrayal of henchman Zigesfeld in the 1991 film If Looks Could Kill, and for twice portraying physicist Dr.Robert Oppenheimer.

Career

A character actor with an impactful presence, Rack has worked extensively in film, television and on stage.

He began his career on stage in Montreal, at the Saidye Bronfman Centre for the Arts before appearing at the Phoenix Theatre, Laurentian Theatre, Théâtre du Rideau Vert and Centaur.

Many of his formative years as an actor were spent working with the National Film Board of Canada doing voice-over work for short films. Among his first feature film roles was  Dr. Meister in The Blue Man in 1985 and Faulkner in Toby McTeague in 1986, both films which were nominated for two Genie Awards. His best known role came in 1991, when he played the villain Zigesfeld in the James Bond spoof If Looks Could Kill starring Richard Grieco. He has portrayed Doctor Robert Oppenheimer on screen twice, in the 1987 mini-series Race for the Bomb and in the 1996 TV movie Einstein: Light to the Power of 2. In 2003, he had a supporting role as the leading character's father in Chasing Holden, starring DJ Qualls. Other notable roles include Mirak in the 1996 TV movie Ivana Trump's For Love Alone and Brother Abel, a psychotic priest in the 2002 Sherlock Holmes television flick The Case of the Whitechapel Vampire. Rack also made brief appearances in the blockbuster films Jesus of Montreal, 300 and The Greatest Game Ever Played.

Rack has supplied voices for animation including Animal Crackers, The Country Mouse and the City Mouse Adventures, Billy and Buddy, Sea Dogs, Lucky Luke, Daft Planet, Princess Sissi, The Magical Adventures of Quasimodo, Arthur, Marsupilami, Ratz, Ivanhoe, Wunschpunsch, Ripley's Believe It or Not!, A Miss Mallard Mystery and Patrol 03. He wrote one episode of Nickelodeon's Are You Afraid of the Dark?, called "The Tale of the Pinball Wizard" in which he also played two characters, and in addition, he played The Watcher in the episode The Tale of Watcher's Woods.

Rack appeared as a contestant on Jeopardy! on September 27 and 28, 1993, amassing a total of $18,300 in winnings as a one-day champion. He lives in Montreal, Quebec.

Filmography

Film

Television

References

External links

Reisler Talent Agency Profile

Year of birth missing (living people)
Living people
Canadian male film actors
Canadian male stage actors
Canadian male television actors
Canadian television writers
Canadian male voice actors
Canadian male television writers
20th-century Canadian male actors
21st-century Canadian male actors